The 1982 European Formula Two Championship was the sixteenth edition of the European Formula Two Championship, the main feeder series to Formula One. It was contested over 13 rounds and featured 22 different teams, 53 different drivers, seven different chassis and five different engines. Corrado Fabi won the championship in a works March-BMW after a season-long battle with teammate Johnny Cecotto and the Spirit-Honda of Thierry Boutsen.

Calendar

Note

 The Spa race was originally scheduled over 30 laps, but was abandoned after 23 due to heavy rain. Full points were still awarded.

Championship standings

At each race points were awarded as follows: 9 for first place, 6 for second place, 4 for third place, 3 for fourth place, 2 for fifth place and 1 for sixth place. The best nine results could be retained. Discarded points and gross totals are displayed within parentheses.

Complete overview

R = retired, Rx = retired but classified (placing denoted by x), NC = not classified, NS = did not start, NQ = did not qualify, NPQ = did not pre-qualify, DIS = disqualified (if after race, placing beforehand displayed alongside in parentheses)

References

Formula Two
European Formula Two Championship seasons